Taiki Paniani (born 22 February 1996) is a Cook Island international lawn bowler.

He was born in Rarotonga, Cook Islands and was selected as part of the Cook Islands team for the 2018 Commonwealth Games on the Gold Coast in Queensland where he reached the semi finals of the Pairs with Aidan Zittersteijn. They then claimed a bronze medal after defeating Malta in the play off to win the first ever medal for the nation.

In 2019, he won a gold medal at the Pacific Games in the fours event.

References

1997 births
Living people
Bowls players at the 2018 Commonwealth Games
Commonwealth Games medallists in lawn bowls
Commonwealth Games medallists for the Cook Islands
Medallists at the 2018 Commonwealth Games